Mochammad Irvan Febrianto (born October 9, 1996) is an Indonesian professional footballer who plays as a full-back for Liga 1 club Persita Tangerang.

Honours

Club 
Persebaya Surabaya
 Liga 2: 2017

References

External links
 Irvan Febrianto at Soccerway
 Irvan Febrianto at Liga Indonesia

1996 births
Living people
Indonesian footballers
Liga 1 (Indonesia) players
Liga 2 (Indonesia) players
Persebaya Surabaya players
Persiba Balikpapan players
BaBel United F.C. players
Muba Babel United F.C. players
Persita Tangerang players
Association football defenders
People from Kediri (city)
Sportspeople from East Java